Spurius Postumius can refer to a number of different people from Roman history:

Spurius Postumius Albus Regillensis (consul 466 BC)
Spurius Postumius Albus Regillensis (consul 432 BC)
Spurius Postumius Albinus Regillensis, consular tribune in 394 BC
Spurius Postumius Albinus Caudinus, consul in 334 and 321 BC, general in the Second Samnite War
Spurius Postumius Albinus Paullulus, consul in 174 BC
Spurius Postumius Albinus Magnus, consul 148 BC
Spurius Postumius Albinus (consul 110 BC)